Nozar Azadi (1938 – 27 February 2021) was an Iranian comedian and actor who was famous in Iran in the 1970s, mostly because of his role in TV series such as Italia, Italia, Kaf show, and Okhtapus.

Career
He was born in Kermanshah, Iran, in 1938. Azadi appeared in many shows, television series and films in the Iranian era prior to the 1979 Islamic Revolution.

Azadi starred in many films of Samad and Leila, the Kaf Show directed by Parviz Sayad, and his own television series Italia Italia, playing the character Ghatebeh.  Ghatebeh played in many shows where he impersonated a Kermanshahi man who was a con man by nature, very slick and a great communicator/womanizer. Ghatebeh had a distinguished Kermanshahi accent that to this day, 40 years later, people of Iran still remember with amusement.

In 1971, Azadi performed in Peter Brook's production of Orghast in Persepolis, which was part of the 2,500 year celebration of the Persian Empire.

Azadi fled from Iran to Germany, where he lived in Bremen for 20 years, and then moved to the United States. He made no more films, but took up painting.

In 2010, Azadi exhibited his paintings at the Seyhoun Gallery in Hollywood, California.

Filmography
 Jew's Harp, 1975 
 Mozaffar, 1974 
 Samad goes to School, 1973  (as Director)
 Suitor, 1972 
 Samad and Solomon, 1971

References

External links
Azadi's Official Website

1938 births
2021 deaths
Iranian male film actors
Iranian male television actors
Iranian expatriates in Germany
Iranian expatriates in the United States